François Billoux (21 May 1903 – 14 January 1978) was a French communist politician.

Biography
Billoux was born in Saint-Romain-la-Motte. He was a member of the Central Committee of the French Communist Party (PCF) from 1926, and a member of the Politburo from 1936. From 1928 until 1931, he was also General Secretary of the Young Communist Movement of France (MJCF), the youth wing of the PCF.

Billoux served as a member of the Chamber of Deputies from 1936 to 1940, and the National Assembly from 1945 to 1978, representing Bouches-du-Rhône. During World War II, Billoux was interned in France and Algeria from 1940 until he was freed after Operation Torch in 1943. In the post-war years, he served as Minister of Public Health (1944–1945), Minister of National Economy (1945–1946), Minister of Reconstruction and Urban Development (1946) and Minister of National Defence (1947). He died in Menton, and is buried in Père Lachaise Cemetery in Paris.

References

1903 births
1978 deaths
People from Loire (department)
Politicians from Auvergne-Rhône-Alpes
French Communist Party politicians
Members of the 16th Chamber of Deputies of the French Third Republic
Members of the Constituent Assembly of France (1945)
Members of the Constituent Assembly of France (1946)
Deputies of the 1st National Assembly of the French Fourth Republic
Deputies of the 2nd National Assembly of the French Fourth Republic
Deputies of the 3rd National Assembly of the French Fourth Republic
Deputies of the 1st National Assembly of the French Fifth Republic
Deputies of the 2nd National Assembly of the French Fifth Republic
Deputies of the 3rd National Assembly of the French Fifth Republic
Deputies of the 4th National Assembly of the French Fifth Republic
Deputies of the 5th National Assembly of the French Fifth Republic